Môle-Saint-Nicolas is an arrondissement in the Nord-Ouest Department of Haiti. As of 2015, the population was 245,590 inhabitants. Postal codes in the Môle-Saint-Nicolas Arrondissement start with the number 33.

The arrondissement consists of the following communes:
 Môle Saint-Nicolas
 Baie-de-Henne
 Bombardopolis
 Jean-Rabel

References

Arrondissements of Haiti
Nord-Ouest (department)